A. J. W. Dawson was a Tyneside singer/songwriter and performer in the late 19th and early 20th century.

He wrote and performed a work titled “A Record Run” at a special dinner given by Wilson Worsdell Esq. J.P.  M.I.M.E. to the retired officials and engine drivers of the N.E.R. Co., in Gateshead, on 11 February 1910

The song belongs to a surprisingly small group of North East humorous railway songs (remembering that the area was the birthplace of the Railways) and describes a journey from South Shields to Newcastle

A. J. W. Dawson published a six-page chapbook titled “A Record Run”, printed by the Tyne Printing Works Limited, a copy of which is held in the archives of Gateshead Council

See also
 Geordie dialect words

References

External links
FARNE Folk archive – Record Run, front cover

English singers
English songwriters
People from Newcastle upon Tyne (district)
Musicians from Tyne and Wear
20th-century deaths
19th-century births
Geordie songwriters